Bernard Chapuis (born 1945 in Algiers) is a French writer and journalist.

Biography 
A journalist working for Combat, he joined Le Canard enchaîné in the 1970s. He later succeeded Robert Escarpit for the daily notes in Le Monde.

In 2005, he won the prix Roger-Nimier for his novel La Vie parlée published by éditions Stock and the prix des Deux Magots in 2010 for Le Rêve entouré d'eau at the same publisher. This novel also earned him the Prix Mottard of the Académie française.

He was named officier in the Ordre des Arts et des Lettres in January 2010.

Works 
1977: 
1983: 
1986: 
1987: 
1997: 
2005:  Prix Roger-Nimier 2005)
2006: 
2009:  (Prix des Deux Magots 2010)
2012: , Prix Jean-Freustié 2012

Filmography 
2010 :  by Pascal Thomas
2015 : Valentin Valentin by Pascal Thomas

References

External links 
 Bernard Chapuis on the site of the Académie française
 Barnard Chapuis on France Inter
 Bernard Chapuis empoche le prix Jean-Freustié on Bibliobs
 Bernard Chapuis : Onze ans avec Lou on Le Figaro

20th-century French journalists
21st-century French journalists
20th-century French writers
20th-century French male writers
21st-century French writers
Roger Nimier Prize winners
Prix des Deux Magots winners
Prix Jean Freustié winners
Officiers of the Ordre des Arts et des Lettres
1945 births
People from Algiers
Living people
French male non-fiction writers